Fischbachau is a municipality in the district of Miesbach in Bavaria in Germany.

Geography 

Fischbachau is located in the valley of the river Leitzach, on an Alluvial fan at the east edge of the Leitzachtals and at the foot of Breitenstein mountain.
The town is located 9 miles away from Miesbach, 15 miles from Rosenheim, 19 miles from Kufstein and 37 miles from Munich, capital city of Bavaria.

History 

Fischbachau is mentioned for the first time in the Frisian Liber commutationum et traditionum around 1078-1080.
From 1096 to 1100 the St. Martin abbey was constructed and in 1803 the Scheyern Abbey.
In 1811 Fischbachau was turned into a formal municipality with a mayor.
During World War II, a subcamp of the Dachau concentration camp was located here.
In 1976 Hundham, Wörnsmühl, and in 1978 southern parts of a territory of the former municipality of Niklasreuth were merged into the Municipality of Fischbachau.

Culture

Notable persons
 Kathi Greinsberger, Volkslied composer
 Josef Brunnhuber (1876–1936), periodist
 Eduard Stemplinger (1870–1964), author
 Fritz Müller-Partenkirchen (1875–1942), author
 Amelie Kober (born 1987), snowboarder
 Max Rauffer (born 1972), snowboarder
 Benjamin Lauth (born 1981), football player
 Paul Schneider-Esleben (1915–2005), architect
 Karl Höller (1907–1987), composer

Bands
Fischbachauer Sängerinnen
Fischbachauer Tanzlmusi
Roaner Sängerinnen
Musikkapelle Fischbachau

Tourism and Sights

External links 
 Fischbachau official Site

References

Miesbach (district)